A return merchandise authorization (RMA), return authorization (RA) or return goods authorization (RGA) is a part of the process of returning a product to receive a refund, replacement, or repair during the product's warranty period. Both parties can decide how to deal with it, which could be refund, replacement or repair.

Return merchandise authorization
The issuance of an RMA/RGA is a key gatekeeping moment in the reverse logistics cycle, providing the vendor with a final opportunity to diagnose and correct the customer's problem with the product (such as improper installation or configuration) before the customer permanently relinquishes ownership of the product to the manufacturer, commonly referred to as a return. As returns are costly for the vendor and inconvenient for the customer, any return that can be prevented benefits both parties.

Return management
Returned merchandise requires management after the return. The product has a second life cycle after the return.

An important aspect of RMA management is learning from RMA trends to prevent further returns. Depending on what the rules are, the manufacturer may send the customer an advance replacement. RMAs may be minimized in a number of ways. Adding a customer survey capability may prevent RMAs by detecting problems in advance of returns.

Returns are sometimes minimized by reducing transaction errors prior to the merchandise leaving the seller. Providing additional information to consumers also reduces returns.

Return to vendor
Return to vendor (RTV) is the process where goods are returned to the original vendor instead of the distributor. In many cases the RTV was originally returned to the seller by the end consumer. While RTV transactions usually occur between the seller and the vendor, in some instances the end consumer returns the product directly to the vendor, sidestepping the distributor.

See also
 Product return

References

Contract law
Computer law
Product return